Ferraria is a genus of monocotyledonous flowering plants in the family Iridaceae, native to tropical and southern Africa. They are herbaceous corm-bearing plants growing to 30–45 cm tall. Some species have an unpleasant scent similar to rotting meat and are pollinated by flies, while others have a pleasant scent. The genus name is a tribute to Italian Jesuit Botanist and botanical artist Giovanni Baptista Ferrari.
 They are grown as ornamental plants in gardens in subtropical regions.

 Species
 Ferraria brevifolia G.J.Lewis - Cape Province of South Africa
 Ferraria candelabrum (Baker) Rendle - Angola, Zambia
 Ferraria crispa Burm. (syn. F. undulata) - Cape Province; naturalized in Spain, Australia, Canary Islands, Madeira
 Ferraria densepunctulata M.P.de Vos - Cape Province
 Ferraria divaricata Sw. - Cape Province
 Ferraria ferrariola (Jacq.) Willd. - Cape Province
 Ferraria flava Goldblatt & J.C.Manning - Cape Province
 Ferraria foliosa G.J.Lewis - Cape Province
 Ferraria glutinosa (Baker) Rendle - from Cape Province north to Zaïre 
 Ferraria macrochlamys (Baker) Goldblatt & J.C.Manning - Cape Province
 Ferraria ornata Goldblatt & J.C.Manning - Cape Province
 Ferraria ovata (Thunb.) Goldblatt & J.C.Manning - Cape Province
 Ferraria parva Goldblatt & J.C.Manning - Cape Province
 Ferraria schaeferi Dinter - Cape Province, Namibia
 Ferraria spithamaea (Baker) Goldblatt & J.C.Manning - Angola
 Ferraria uncinata Sweet - Cape Province
 Ferraria variabilis Goldblatt & J.C.Manning - Cape Province, Namibia
 Ferraria welwitschii Baker - Zaïre, Zambia, Zimbabwe, Angola

References

Other sources
 Biodiversity South Africa: Ferraria
 UNEP-WCMC Species Database: Ferraria
 Germplasm Resources Information Network: Ferraria
 Flora of Namibia: Ferraria
 Flora of Zimbabwe: Ferraria

Iridaceae
Iridaceae genera
Flora of Africa